Fraktur is a highly artistic and elaborate illuminated folk art created by the Pennsylvania Dutch, named after the Fraktur script associated with it. Most Fraktur were created between 1740 and 1860.

Fraktur drawings were executed in ink and/or watercolors and are found in a wide variety of forms: the Vorschriften (writing samples), the Taufscheine (birth and baptismal certificates), marriage and house blessings, book plates, and floral and figurative scenes. The earlier Fraktur were executed entirely by hand, while printed text became increasingly common in later examples. Common artistic motifs in Fraktur include birds (distelfinks), hearts, and tulips, as well as blackletter (Fraktur) and italic calligraphy.

Many major American museums, including the American Folk Art Museum, the Metropolitan Museum of Art, the Philadelphia Museum of Art, and the Winterthur Museum have Fraktur in their collections. Important Fraktur have been sold by major American auction houses and antique dealers for prices in excess of $100,000. The definitive text on Fraktur is widely considered to be The Fraktur-Writings or Illuminated Manuscripts of the Pennsylvania Germans, written by Dr. Donald A. Shelley and published by the Pennsylvania German Society in 1961. In late 2004, the majority of Dr. Shelley's Fraktur collection was sold at public auction at Pook & Pook, Inc. in Downingtown, Pennsylvania, for $913,448.

Notable artists

Notable fraktur artists within the Pennsylvania German community include:

Christian Alsdorff
Johannes Bard
Samuel Bentz
Martin Brechall
George Peter Deisert
George Heinrich Engellhard
Johann Adam Eyer
Johann Conrad Gilbert
Samuel Gottschall
Johann Jacob Friedrich Krebs
Christian Mertel
Daniel Otto
Johann Henrich Otto
Daniel Peterman
Francis Charles Portzline
Daniel Schumacher
Johannes Ernst Spangenberg
Christian Strenge
John Van Minian

Other artists of note include Jacob Strickler, from the Shenandoah Valley of Virginia, and Anna Weber, an Ontario resident and one of a few fraktur artists active in Canada. Anonymous artists whose work is recognized include the Cross-Legged Angel Artist, the Ehre Vater Artist, and the Sussel-Washington Artist. Stylistically related work was produced by Ludwig Denig.

See also

 Hex sign

Further reading
Hartung, Ruthanne. Fraktur: Tips, Tools, and Techniques for Learning the Craft. Mechanicsburg, Pennsylvania: Stackpole Books, 2008.
Moyer, Dennis K. Fraktur writings and folk art drawings of the Schwenkfelder Library Collection. Kutztown, Pennsylvania: The Pennsylvania German Society, 1997.
Shelley, Donald. The Fraktur Writings or Illuminated Manuscripts of the Pennsylvania Germans. Allentown, Pennsylvania: Pennsylvania German Folklore Society, 1961.
Earnest, Corinne and Russell. To The Latest Prosperity: Pennsylvania-German Family Registers in the Fraktur Tradition. University Park, Pennsylvania: The Pennsylvania German Society, 2004.
Earnest, Corinne and Russell. Papers For Birth Dayes: Guide To the Fraktur Artists and Scriveners.  East Berlin, Pennsylvania:  Russell D. Earnest Associates, 1997. 2 Volumes.
Earnest, Corinne and Russell. Fraktur: Folk Art & Family. Atglen, Pennsylvania: Schiffer Publishing Ltd., 1999.
Earnest, Russell and Corinne. Flying Leaves and One-Sheets: Pennsylvania German Broadsides, Fraktur, and Their Printers. New Castle, Delaware: Oak Knoll Books, 2005.
Fraktur and Related Works on Paper, The Pioneer Collection of Dr. & Mrs. Donald A. Shelley, Auction Catalogue, October 8, 2004, Pook & Pook, Inc., Downingtown, Pennsylvania - www.pookandpook.com.

External links

 ExplorePaHistory.com
 Fraktur and related resources.
 Schwenkfelder Museum.
 Pennsylvania Fraktur.
 Penn State University Press To the Latest Posterity, the most recent book published by the Pennsylvania German Society on the Fraktur tradition.
 Pennsylvania German Arts and Antiques: News and Commentary by Clarke Hess
 Auction report by Maine Antique Digest on the auction of the Shelley's fraktur.
 Free Library of Philadelphia - Fraktur  - Digital Collections
Several digitized books on Pennsylvania Dutch arts and crafts, design, and prints from The Metropolitan Museum of Art Libraries

Blackletter
Pennsylvania culture
Illuminated manuscripts
American folk art
Pennsylvania Dutch culture